Glen Island is an island in Nunavut, Canada. It is located in the Qikiqtaaluk Region's side of the Gulf of Boothia within Committee Bay. It is northeast of Wales Island and west of the mainland's Melville Peninsula.

Islands of the Gulf of Boothia
Uninhabited islands of Qikiqtaaluk Region